A social relation is the fundamental unit of analysis within the social sciences, and describes any voluntary or involuntary interpersonal relationship between two or more individuals within and/or between groups. The group can be a language or kinship group, a social institution or organization, an economic class, a nation, or gender. Social relations are derived from human behavioral ecology, and, as an aggregate, form a coherent social structure whose constituent parts are best understood relative to each other and to the social ecosystem as a coherent whole.

Early inquiries into the nature of social relations feature in the work of sociologists such as Max Weber in his theory of social action, where social relationships composed of both positive (affiliative) and negative (agonistic) interactions represented opposing effects. Categorizing social interactions enables observational and other social research, such as Gemeinschaft and Gesellschaft (lit. 'community and society'), collective consciousness, etc.

Forms of relation and interaction 
According to Piotr Sztompka, forms of relation and interaction in sociology and anthropology may be described as follows: first and most basic are animal-like behaviors, i.e. various physical movements of the body. Then there are actions—movements with a meaning and purpose. Then there are social behaviors, or social actions, which address (directly or indirectly) other people, which solicit a response from another agent.

Next are social contacts, a pair of social actions, which form the beginning of social interactions. Symbols define social relationships. Without symbols, our social life would be no more sophisticated than that of animals. For example, without symbols people would have no aunts or uncles, employers or teachers-or even brothers and sisters. In sum, symbolic integrations analyze how social life depends on the ways people define themselves and others. They study face-to-face interaction, examining how people make sense out of life, how they determine their relationships.

See also 

Affectional action
Communicative action
Dramaturgical action
Instrumental and value-rational action
Interdependence
Interpersonal relationship
Relations of production
Social isolation
Social movement
Social multiplier effect
Social robot
Symbolic interactionism
Traditional action

Related disciplines 
 Behavioral Ecology
 Behavioral Sciences
 Engaged theory
 Social Ecology
 Social Philosophy
 Social Psychology

References

Bibliography
 Azarian, Reza. 2010. "Social Ties: Elements of a Substantive Conceptualisation". Acta Sociologica 53(4):323–38.
 Piotr Sztompka, Socjologia, Znak, 2002, 
 Weber, Max. "The Nature of Social Action". In Weber: Selections in Translation, edited by W. G. Runciman. Cambridge: Cambridge University Press. 1991.

Community building
Interpersonal relationships